General Sir Roland Kelvin Guy  (25 June 1928 – 13 December 2005) was a senior British Army officer who was Adjutant-General to the Forces.

Military career
Born in Srinagar, Kashmir, and educated at Wellington College and at the Royal Military Academy, Sandhurst, Roland Guy was commissioned into the Kings Royal Rifle Corps (the 60th) in 1948. He served as an adjutant with the Kenya Regiment during the Mau Mau Uprising. He was adjutant of the 2nd Green Jackets (KRRC) during the confrontation with Indonesia. He became commanding officer of the 1st Battalion The Royal Green Jackets in 1969. He was awarded the Distinguished Service Order for service in Northern Ireland in 1972. In 1972 he became Commander of 24 Airportable Brigade.

He was Chief of Staff, HQ BAOR from 1978 to 1980 when he became Military Secretary. He was Adjutant-General to the Forces from 1984 to 1986.

He was also appointed ADC General to the Queen in 1984.

Guy was appointed a Member of the Order of the British Empire in 1955, a Commander of the Order of the British Empire in 1978, a Knight Commander of the Order of the Bath in 1981, and a Knight Grand Cross of the Order of the Bath in 1987.

Retirement
He was a Governor of the Royal Hospital Chelsea from 1987 to 1993, and Chairman of the Army Benevolent Fund also from 1987 to 1993.

Family
In 1957 he married Deirdre Graves-Morris and they went on to have two daughters.

References

 

|-
 

|-

 

1928 births
2005 deaths
Military personnel of British India
British people in colonial India
People educated at Wellington College, Berkshire
Graduates of the Royal Military Academy Sandhurst
King's Royal Rifle Corps officers
Royal Green Jackets officers
British Army generals
British military personnel of the Mau Mau Uprising
British military personnel of The Troubles (Northern Ireland)
Companions of the Distinguished Service Order
Knights Grand Cross of the Order of the Bath
Commanders of the Order of the British Empire
People from Srinagar
British Army personnel of the Indonesia–Malaysia confrontation
Kenya Regiment officers